Cerje Cave or Cerjanka is a cave in southeast Serbia.

Location 

Geology 

Entry into the Cerje cave is situated on the western side of the Kalafat mountain, in the wider area of the Kamenički vis plateau. Entrance is located at the point where the river of Provalijska reka sinks underground. The cave itself is hydrologically active. Geologists estimate that the cave is some 2 million years old.

Right behind the ending of the low entry section, a large fossil canal was discovered. Today it ends with the plug of blocks, but it is believed that it represents the connection with the old entries into the cave which are now buried under the eroded sides of the amphitheater which marks the ending of the Provalijska reka's blind valley. The Cerje cave is a wet cave. Even during the summer, when the river dries out, there are ponds at the entrance. Further in the cave, the water flows for  through the Main corridor, up to the siphon. Other corridors, including the High canal (which is above the central flow), even though they have water in the eroded holes, doesn't seem to have an active water flow. Area of the cave between the siphon and the "Salomna chamber" is called the Moon canal and is carved in the black limestone, eroded into sharp, pointy forms. Eroded water holes are everywhere and the upper sections of almost all corridors, even those deep in the cave, are abundant in allogenic pebblestone and gravel which remained in the niches. It shows that the entire cave was once filled with the allogenic material which was later washed away. Geology had to be different at that time as the modern topography and hydrography in the surrounding area of the cave does not point to the river flow so powerful to wash away the cave. Ceiling of the cave is partially made of an unusual mass which has an appearance of the decomposing limestone. Microscopic analysis showed that the limestone used to be altered by the thermal waters.

Plans were made to turn it into a touristic attraction so the narrow entrance was widened by the explosives and the silt brought by the Provalijska reka was removed. However, the job of turning it into the touristic destination was never achieved. Thought to be completely explored, the cave was left unattended until the fall of 1995 when the members of the Student speleologic and alpinistic club (ASAK) explored the cave again and discovered that there is an extension to the main corridor.

Dye tracing conducted in the 1970s proved the connection between the cave and the well of Kravljansko vrelo, but members of ASAK wanted to dive through the well to the cave.

Another feature which is suspected to be connected to the cave is the pit above the Kravljansko vrelo. In the winter of 1996 ASAK explored the pit again. Strong air drift from the eroded shaft at the bottom of the pit points to the existence of the spacious canal in the pit's extension, which is most likely connected to the Cerje cave. Previous measurements showed that the pit is located right above the cave's "Salomna chamber" which is located at the end of the corridor, as much as it was explored at the time. A plan was made to dig through the pit's bottom shaft in order to make an easier access to the distant areas of the cave. The pit corridors and the spring are called Gornjekravljansko vrelo or Pećurina.

A bypass was discovered around the siphon at the then ending of the corridor. It is assumed that during the period of the spring high waters, the plug is probably washed away, establishing connection between the siphon and the well. Passages which lead to the extension behind the siphon were widened and the new corridor is named "Via Kravlje". At that moment, it was the third longest cave in Serbia after the Lazar's Cave and the Ušak Cave system.

In 2015, new corridors were discovered, and an assumption that they connect the cave with the Kravljansko vrelo was confirmed in December 2016 when the corridors were successfully passed through. The new corridor to Kravljansko vrelo was named the "Houdini passage" and the final feature in it is the Siphon II. In August 2017, the speleologist finally reached what they believe is the end of cave but they also established that the Cerje Cave System consists of the cave (Provalija), the spring of Kravljansko vrelo and the corridors surrounding the Pećurina pit above. The explorers wish to continue examination of the cave and to find whether it is connected to another local pit, Cerjanska propast.

Name 

Original, local name for the cave was Provalija, after the river which sinks into the cave. Provalija is Serbian for chasm or abyss. Speleologists who explored the cave named it Cerjanka, after the village of Cerje as the cave is located in the village territory. Official name was established as the Cerjanska pećina (Cerje cave).

Characteristics 

Varieties of the speleothems that developed in the cave include stalactites, stalagmites, helictites, wave draperies, cave corals and crystal flowers. The cave is especially noted for its helictites or the cave roses, which are actually stalactites that have a central canal with twig-like or spiral projections that appear to defy gravity. They can have many forms and those in Cerje cave are rose-like, as they spread in all directions due to the air currents. Cave roses, like the ones formed in the cave are not found in any other locality in the Balkans.

Wildlife 

The cave is abundant in fire salamanders.

Protection 

The Cerje cave is under protection since 1955. In 1998, Institute for nature conservation of Serbia declared the cave a natural monument.

In 2013 another plan for the turning of the cave into the touristic attraction was announced. Two mini dams and one bridge were built on the Provalijska reka in order to prevent it from burying the entrance with silt. But as of 2017, the cave is still not open for public.

Gallery

References 

Caves of Serbia
Nišava District
Protected areas of Serbia